A “thief in law” (Russian: вор в зако́не, Georgian: კანონიერი ქურდი, Uzbek: qonundagi oʻgʻri), in the Soviet Union, the post-Soviet states, and respective diasporas abroad is a specifically granted formal and special status of "criminal authority", a professional criminal who enjoys an elite position among other notified mobsters within the organized crime and correctional facility environments and employs informal authority over its lower-status members.

The phrase "Thieves in Law", otherwise known as "Vory", is a calque of the Russian slang phrase "вор в зако́не," literally translated as "a Thief in [a position of] the law." The phrase has two distinct meanings in Russian: "A legalized thief" and "A thief who is the Law." "Vor" came to mean 'thief' no earlier than in the 18th century, before which it meant "criminal". The word retains this meaning in the professional criminal argot. 

Each new Vor (thief) is a made and vetted, literally "crowned" male; with respective rituals and tattoos, by the consensus of several Vory. Vor culture is inseparable from prison organized crime: only repeatedly jailed convicts are eligible for Vor status. Thieves in law are drawn from many nationalities from a number of post-Soviet states, but the majority are ethnic Georgians and ethnic minorities from Georgia.

History 
Although Russia, Ukraine, Georgia, Armenia, Azerbaijan, Kyrgyzstan and Uzbekistan have long had criminals and bandits, during the disorder of the Russian Revolution of 1917, armed gangs proliferated until they became a very significant factor which controlled society. The criminal culture with its own slang, culture and laws became known as vorovskoy mir or "Criminal/Thieves' World."

As the police and court system were re-established in the Soviet Union shortly after the 1917 revolution, the NKVD secret police nearly exterminated the criminal underworld completely. Under Stalin, the forced labor camps (Gulag) overflowed with political prisoners and criminals, and a new organized group of top criminals arose, the vory v zakone, or "thieves in law."

The "thieves in law" formed as a society for ruling the criminal underworld within the prison camps, "who govern the dark gaps in Soviet life beyond the reach of the KGB." They adopted a system of collective responsibility, and swore to a code of "complete submission to the laws of criminal life, including obligations to support the criminal ideal, and rejection of labor and political activities."

For example, while incarcerated, a Vor (вор) must refuse all work, and is not allowed to assist the warden/correction officers in any way. The thieves' code states: "Your own prison you shall not make." If an inmate walks past a guard, and the guard asks him to ring the dinner bell, the convict must refuse or he will be judged by his fellow inmates and found guilty of assisting his jailers. The Vory organized their own courts and held trials governed by the code of 'thieves' honor and tradition'. 

Acceptance into the group is often marked by specific tattoos, allowing all members of the criminal world to instantly recognize a "thief in law". Most prison inmates are tattooed (by other inmates) to indicate their rank within the criminal world, noteworthy criminal accomplishments and places of former incarceration. For example, a tattoo of one cat indicates that the criminal robs alone while multiple cats indicate that he has partners during robberies. Reportedly, "while the Communist Party had a steadfast grip on government and society, the Vory had something of a monopoly on crime."

After World War II, the vory in the Gulag system were weakened by the so-called Bitch Wars – a prison gang war between pure vory and the so-called suki ("bitches"). The 'suki' were former members of the criminal underworld who had broken the thieves' code by agreeing to cooperate with administration of prisons and labor camps. The "Bitch Wars" lasted for decades. Due to a large number of 'suki', most gulags were divided into two separate zones: one for 'suki' and one for 'vory'.

After the breakup of the Soviet Union in the 1990s, the vory assumed a leading role within the Russian criminal hierarchy (see Russian mafia). The group was able to "infiltrate the top political and economic strata while taking command of the burgeoning crime network that spread murderously through the post-Soviet countries." Thieves In Law are given the title by other vory and in order to be accepted they must demonstrate considerable leadership skills, personal ability, intellect, charisma, along with a well-documented criminal record. 

Once accepted they must live according to the thieves' code. The penalty for violation of this code is often mutilation or death. Reportedly, "today the Vory have spread around the world, to Madrid, Berlin, and New York" and are "involved in everything from petty theft to billion-dollar money-laundering while also acting as arbiters among conflicting Russian criminal factions."

Reportedly, as capitalism began to take hold in Russia, an increasing number of college-educated criminals began to take over more lucrative ventures. While these new criminal elements first worked with the Vory in the 1990s, in the 2000s (decade), ties to big business and government grew in importance. Consequently, while the "Vory are still strong in gambling and retail trade," their importance in Russian economy and society has decreased. However, since the majority of criminals eventually are arrested and incarcerated, at some point they will come in contact with the Vory who are at the top of the hierarchy of the criminal world within the penal system in Russia.

In 2011, the Obama administration implemented sanctions against an organisation known as the Brothers' Circle, several members of which are thieves-in-law.

Ethics and code of conduct 
"Ponyatiya" (literally "the definitions") is the rules of conduct (or even the customary law or code of honor) among prison inmates, with Vory being respectful leaders and judges according to these rules.

Vory consider prisons their true home and have a saying, "The home for angels is heaven, and the home for a Vor is prison." According to Aleksandr Gurov, an expert on the Vory who headed the organized crime units of the Soviet Interior Ministry and the GRU, "unlike the Cosa Nostra the Vory have 'less rules, but more severe rules' [and the] members must have no ties to the government, meaning they cannot serve in the army or cooperate with officials while in prison. They must also have served several jail sentences before they can be considered. They also are not allowed to get married."

Furthermore, according to Michael Schwirtz, "ethnicity has rarely determined whether someone can join the club, and today many members, even those active inside Russia, are from other post-Soviet countries such as Armenia, Georgia, and are not ethnic Russians."

While there still are many ethnic Russian vory, many also are drawn from other ethnic groups from the former Soviet Union.

Set of rules according to Aleksandr Gurov
Under the theoretical code of the vory, a thief must:
Defend and love his relatives—mother, father, brothers, sisters...
Not have a family of his own—no wife, no children; this does not however, preclude him from having a lover.
Never under any circumstances work, no matter how much difficulty this brings—live only on means gleaned from thievery.
Help other thieves—both by moral and material support, utilizing the commune of thieves.
Keep secret information about the whereabouts of accomplices (i.e. dens, districts, hideouts, safe apartments, etc.).
In unavoidable situations (if a thief is under investigation) take the blame for someone else's crime; this buys the other person a time of freedom.
Demand a convocation of inquiry for the purpose of resolving disputes in the event of a conflict between oneself and other thieves, or between thieves.
If necessary, participate in such inquiries.
Carry out the punishment of the offending thief as decided by the convocation.
Not resist carrying out the decision of punishing the offending thief who is found guilty, with punishment determined by the convocation.
Have good command of the thieves' jargon ("Fenya").
Not gamble without being able to cover losses. The losses must be covered in the agreed time.
Teach young beginners.
Have, if possible, informants from the rank and file of thieves.
Not lose your reasoning ability when using alcohol.
Have nothing to do with the authorities (particularly with the ITU [Correctional Labor Authority]), not participate in public activities, nor join any community organizations.
Not take weapons from the hands of authorities; not serve in the military.
Make good on promises given to other thieves.

The above code is no longer in use besides the standard prison code of ethics of not cooperating with prison authorities or informing on your fellow inmates. Aleksandr Solzhenitsyn, author of The Gulag Archipelago, claimed never to have seen any thief honor the code if it conflicted with his personal criminal wants.

Vory tattoos 

The Vory subculture (more exactly: the prison inmate subculture where Vory are the leaders) is well known for having symbolic tattoos. The tattoos are usually done in the prison with primitive tools.

Tattoos associated with the thieves in law include, but are not limited to:
 The eight-pointed star is the main tattoo in thieves world and it usually appears on the shoulders.
 Madonna and her Child (St Mary and the infant Jesus Christ) indicates a criminal lifestyle from a young age
 A spider tattoo, when facing up, denotes an active criminal; facing down, it denotes one who has left the lifestyle
 A circled "A" (done in the style of a finger ring) indicates an anarchist (anarkhist)
 A circle with a dot inside (as finger ring) known as "The Roundstone" indicates an orphan (krugly sirota), or the saying "Trust only yourself" (nadeisya tolko na sebya)
 A skull inside a square (as finger ring) indicates a conviction for aggravated robbery (sudim za razboy)
 A lozenge with an Orthodox cross inside (as finger ring) indicates a thief-in-law (vor v zakone)
 A circle with the left half black, right half white (as finger ring) indicates one who moves around thieves-in-law, but is not one himself (v krugu vorov; "in the circle of thieves")
 The letters "" (kot; cat) indicate a chronic prison inmate (korennoy obitatel tiurmy)
 The letters "" (omut; deep water hole) on the back of the hand indicate "it's hard to get away from me" (ot menya uyti trudno)
 The letters "" (mir; world or peace) on the back of the hand denote one who will never be rehabilitated or re-educated (menya ispravit rasstrel; "a shooting will rehabilitate me")
 The word "" (sever; north) on the back of the hand indicate time done in a Northern prison (Siberia, or Magadan)
 A cat in a hat (from Puss in Boots) on the back of the hand is the symbol of the thieves in law and, as such, denotes one
 The head of the Devil (Fenya: , oskal, bared teeth; Russian: , golova diavola) on the back of the hand denotes one who harbours anger towards the government
 The quincunx on the wrist indicates one who has done extensive time, from the saying "four guard towers and me" (chetyre vyshki i ya)

Notable thieves in law

In popular culture 

 The cast of the 1935 Isaac Babel play Maria includes the character of Isaac Dimshits, a Lithuanian Jewish vor, who rules a black market empire in 1920 St. Petersburg.
 Vory feature in the popular Soviet 1972 comedy film Gentlemen of Fortune – the first Soviet movie to depict the criminal underworld in detail. Although the issue is not directly addressed, both the main character and the criminal "Docent" he is impersonating, sport prison tattoos that may be found on a vor. Other criminals in the film repeatedly characterize "Docent" as an "authority Vor" (literally "avtoritetnyi" – which is the synonym for respected professional criminal).
 The Soviet 1979 TV miniseries The Meeting Place Cannot Be Changed contained the first direct on-screen mention of the Vory phenomenon in the USSR. In the plot, the police are tasked with bringing down a gang of vicious robbers known as the Black Cats in post-war Moscow, several members of whom are described as thieves-in-law.
 In the 2002 Russian TV series Brigada, the main character's gang gets into a conflict with a Vor who tries to bring them under his patronage.
 In the 1988 film Red Heat, Arnold Schwarzenegger portrays a Moscow cop sent to Chicago to bring back a Georgian criminal - Vagran Rustaveli (played by Gábor Koncz).
 Vory feature in the 2007 film Eastern Promises, starring Viggo Mortensen and directed by David Cronenberg.
 Russian prison fighter Yuri Boyka of Undisputed II: Last Man Standing and Undisputed III: Redemption sports several Vor tattoos.
 The 2009 video game Grand Theft Auto: The Ballad of Gay Tony features fictional Georgian crime boss Marki Ashvili.
 The 2010 German TV series Im Angesicht des Verbrechens focuses on the Russian Mafia and its involvement in the black market trade in untaxed cigarettes in Berlin. The characters of Misha and Uncle Sasha are shown to sport prison tattoos that identify them as Vory.
 The 2010 John le Carré novel Our Kind of Traitor is about a Russian Vor trying to defect to the United Kingdom after a dispute with his superiors.
 One of the main plots of the third season of the French TV series Braquo, which aired in 2012-2014, heavily involves Vor of multiple origins (Turk, Armenian, Georgian...).
 The 2016 video game Deus Ex: Mankind Divided features the fictional Georgian Dvali crime family.
 The Denise Mina novel Conviction features a retelling of the suki versus vor war in a side story.
 In the tabletop game Shadowrun, Russian crime families are important criminal elements in Seattle and will often contract players.

See also 

State capture
Armenian Mafia
Crime boss
Criminal tattoos
Kazan phenomenon
Made man
Prison gang
Azeri mafia
Serbian mafia
Thieves by Law (2010 documentary by Alexander Gentelev)
Triads Society
Yakuza
Pink Panthers

Notes

References

External links

 Museum history of thieves (in law) world

 
Transnational organized crime
Organized crime in Armenia
Organized crime in Azerbaijan
Organized crime in Chechnya
Organized crime in Estonia
Organised crime in Georgia (country)
Organized crime in Kyrgyzstan
Organized crime in Russia
Organised crime in Ukraine
Organized crime in Uzbekistan
Prison gangs
Secret societies related to organized crime
Soviet phraseology
Criminal subcultures
Crime in the Soviet Union
Second economy of the Soviet Union